Garfield is both a surname and a given name. Notable people with the name include:

People with the surname Garfield
Abram Garfield (1872–1958), American architect and son of James A. Garfield
Allen Garfield (1939–2020), American actor
Andrew Garfield (born 1983), British American actor
Brian Garfield (born 1939), American novelist and screenwriter
Eugene Garfield (1925–2017), American scientist
Harry Augustus Garfield (1863–1942), lawyer and son of James A. Garfield, President of Williams College and head of the Federal Fuel Administration
Helen Newell Garfield (1866–1930), American socialite and advocate for deaf education. 
Henry Garfield (born 1961), birth name of American artist and musician Henry Rollins
James A. Garfield (1831–1881), 20th president of the United States
James Rudolph Garfield (1865–1950), lawyer and son of James A. Garfield, lawyer and Secretary of the Interior under President Theodore Roosevelt
Jason Garfield (born 1974), juggler and founder of the World Juggling Federation
Joan Garfield, American statistics educator
John Garfield (1913–1952), American actor
Leon Garfield (1921–1996), British writer of fiction
Richard Garfield (born 1963), creator of the game Magic: The Gathering
Sidney Garfield (1906–1984), American doctor who founded the Kaiser Permanente healthcare system
Simon Garfield (born 1960), journalist and author

People with first name Garfield
Garfield Blair (born 1987), Jamaican basketball player
Garfield W. Brown (1881-1967), American lawyer and politician
Garfield "Gar" Heard (born 1948), former professional basketball player
Garfield Kennedy, documentary and fiction film-maker
Garfield Morgan (1931–2009), actor
 Garfield Sobers (born 1936), cricketer
 Garfield Todd (1908–2002), 5th Prime minister of Rhodesia (1953–1958)
Garfield Wood (1880–1971), inventor and entrepreneur

Fictional characters named Garfield
Garfield
Firefly (DC Comics), born Garfield Lynns, a villain in the Detective Comics
Garfield Logan
Lawrence Garfield, from Other People's Money